Four Crosses railway station was a station on the former Cambrian Railways between Oswestry and Welshpool.

History
Opened in 1860 as part of the Oswestry and Newtown Railway (O&NR), it served the village of Four Crosses in Powys, Wales.

In 1963, the former CR mainline was vested to the London Midland Region of British Railways, who decided to keep the parallel former Shrewsbury and Hereford Railway open. The line from Welshpool to Oswestry was hence closed in 1965, including Four Crosses station.

The station was immortalised in 1964 in the song "Slow Train" by Flanders and Swann.

References

Former Cambrian Railway stations
Railway stations in Great Britain opened in 1860
Disused railway stations in Powys
Railway stations in Great Britain closed in 1965
Beeching closures in Wales